Edward Simmons  may refer to:

 Edward Simmons (painter) (1852–1931), American impressionist painter
 Edward E. Simmons (1911–2004), American electrical engineer
 Edward H. H. Simmons (1876–1955), American banker and president of the NYSE
 J. Edward Simmons (1841–1910), American lawyer and banker